Transperth is the system of public transport serving Perth and Mandurah, Western Australia, managed by the state government's Public Transport Authority (PTA). Suburban rail services are operated by Transperth Train Operations, a division of the PTA. The Transperth rail network consists of 75 railway stations and six lines: the Airport line, Armadale and Thornlie lines, the Fremantle line, the Joondalup line, the Mandurah line, and the Midland line.

The first railway opened in the Perth area was the Eastern Railway, which ran from Fremantle to Guildford. This opened on 1 March 1881, and passed through the centre of Perth. The line was extended via Midland Junction to Chidlow, opening on 11 March 1884. The line experienced further extensions and a spur to Mount Helena was opened on 1 July 1896. The South Western Railway, running from Perth to Armadale, opened on 2 May 1893. At the end of 1965, passenger services ceased operating east of Midland. This section of track is today used by the Fremantle and Midland lines, which are through services with each other. The South Western Railway is now used by the Armadale line. A spur off this line to Thornlie opened on 7 August 2005.

Initially served by steam trains, the network began running diesel railcars in 1954. By 5 October 1968, the suburban rail network was operated entirely by diesel railcars. On 2 September 1979, the government of Charles Court closed the Perth to Fremantle line to passenger services, with the government's rationale being low ticket sales. Following the election of Brian Burke's Labor government, the line reopened on 23 July 1983.

The Joondalup line opened on 20 December 1992. The Mandurah line opened on 23 December 2007. These lines operate as through services with each other. The Airport line opened on 9 October 2022, introducing three new stations to the network: Redcliffe, Airport Central and High Wycombe.

Stations

Future stations

See also
List of Transwa railway stations
List of closed Perth railway stations
List of Transperth bus stations

References

External links

Railway stations
Lists of railway stations in Australia
Lists of commuter rail stations
Perth, Western Australia-related lists